Anthony Austin Street (8 February 1926 – 25 October 2022) was an Australian politician. He served in the House of Representatives from 1966 to 1984, representing the Division of Corangamite for the Liberal Party. He held ministerial office in the Fraser Government, serving as Minister for Labor and Immigration (1975), Employment and Industrial Relations (1975–1978), Industrial Relations (1978–1980), and Minister for Foreign Affairs (1980–1983). His father Geoffrey Street was also a federal government minister. Street was the last surviving Liberal minister of the First Fraser Ministry, as well as the last surviving Assistant Minister of the McMahon Government.

Early life
Street was born in Melbourne on 8 February 1926, one of two children born to Evora and Geoffrey Street and was raised at the family property 'Eildon', near Lismore, Victoria. His father was elected to federal parliament in 1934 and promoted to the ministry in 1938. He was killed in the 1940 Canberra air disaster, when his son was 14 years old.

Street attended Melbourne Grammar School.

Political career
In 1966 Street was elected as a Liberal member of the Australian House of Representatives, representing the Corangamite division in Victoria, Australia. He remained in this position, winning re-election, until he resigned on 18 January 1984.

From 14 September 1971, during the McMahon Ministry, he was Assistant Minister assisting the Minister for Labour and National Service. In the First Fraser Ministry he became the Minister for Labour and Immigration. In the Second Fraser Ministry he served as Minister for Employment and Industrial Relations, and Minister assisting the Prime Minister for Public Service Matters. During the Third Fraser Ministry he served as minister in several posts, including Minister for Employment and Industrial Relations and Minister for Industrial Relations. Swapping portfolios with Andrew Peacock, Street served as Australian Minister for Foreign Affairs during the Fourth Fraser Ministry, from 1980 until 1983.

As employment minister, Street ordered the Commonwealth Employment Service to discontinue collecting its seasonal unemployment statistics on the grounds that they had become inaccurate. Responsibility was transferred to the Australian Bureau of Statistics which began issuing monthly figures.

Street supported multilateralism as foreign minister, stating that "in its role as a middle power, Australia needs a foreign policy which encompasses not just bilateral relations but the multilateral diplomacy of international organisations and blocs of countries acting together".

Street's prominent public addresses included the 1979 Alfred Deakin Memorial Lecture "Class Conflict or Common Goals" and the 1982 Roy Milne Memorial Lecture "Alliances and Foreign Policy Today".

Personal life and death
Street held directorships in several companies and served as a Melbourne Cricket Club committee member. He ran a family property at Lismore.

Street died on 25 October 2022, at the age of 96.

See also
Street family

References

1926 births
2022 deaths
Liberal Party of Australia members of the Parliament of Australia
Members of the Australian House of Representatives for Corangamite
Members of the Australian House of Representatives
Members of the Cabinet of Australia
Australian ministers for Foreign Affairs
20th-century Australian politicians
Tony
Royal Australian Navy personnel of World War II